Mike and the Moonpies is an American neotraditional country and Americana band based in Austin, Texas. It was formed by singer-songwriter Mike Harmeier in 2007. Its members are Harmeier and drummer Taylor Englert, guitarist Catlin Rutherford, bassist Omar Oyoque, and steel guitarist Zachary Moulton.

In May 2020, Mike and the Moonpies released Touch of You: The Lost Songs of Gary Stewart, an album of unreleased songs written or co-written by American honky-tonk musician and songwriter Gary Stewart.  The band's version of Stewart's "Smooth Shot of Whiskey," featuring Mark Wystrach of the band Midland was released as a single.

Discography

Albums 
The Real Country (2010)
 Hard Way (2012)
 Mockingbird (2015)
 Live at WinStar World Casino & Resort (2016)
 Steak Night at the Prairie Rose (2018)
Cheap Silver & Solid Country Gold (2019)
Touch of You: The Lost Songs of Gary Stewart (2020)
One to Grow On (2021)

Music videos

Charts

Steak Night At The Prairie Rose

References

External links 
 

Americana music groups
Musical groups from Austin, Texas
Country music groups from Texas
Rock music groups from Texas
Musical groups established in 2007
2007 establishments in Texas